William Henry Penhaligon (1837–1902) was a Cornish barber and perfumer, the founder of the British perfume house Penhaligon's, and Court Barber and Perfumer to Queen Victoria.

Early life
William Henry Penhaligon was born in 1837 in Philby, Penzance, Cornwall.

Career
In 1861, Penhaligon started a perfumers and barbers in Penzance.

In 1869, Penhaligon moved to London, and worked as a barber at the Turkish baths (hammam) on Jermyn Street. In 1872, Penhaligon launched his first fragrance, Hammam Bouquet, and in 1874 he took over the running of the baths' salon, and expanded it to offer perfumery and related items. In 1880, he went into business with his foreman, and Penhaligon's & Jeavons was founded, with premises a few doors away from the baths, also in Jermyn Street.

Penhaligon died in 1902, and the following year they received their first Royal Warrant, from Queen Alexandra.

Personal life
In 1862, Penhaligon married Elisabeth, and they had four children, Clara, Ida, William and Walter.

References

Perfumers
British hairdressers
1837 births
1902 deaths
People from Penzance
British company founders
19th-century British businesspeople